The 1989–1990 Vendée Globe Challenge, which later became the first edition of the Vendée Globe, was a non-stop round the world sailing race, sailed west to east. The start was 26 November 1989 from Les Sables-d'Olonne. Thirteen boats started and seven finished due to multiple abandonments, which is common in this "Everest of the Sea" that is the Vendée Globe. It was won by Titouan Lamazou on 15 March 1990 creating the first benchmark of the event, a record that stood until the 1996–1997 edition.

Background

The inaugural Vendée Globe set off from Les Sables d'Olonne on 26 November 1989. Frenchman Titouan Lamazou, sailing Ecureuil d'Aquitaine II, won the race with a time of 109 days.

Philippe Jeantot, Vendée Globe founder, had problems with breakdowns, and then unfavorable winds, which held him back from the race lead. Philippe Poupon's ketch Fleury Michon X capsized in the Southern Ocean; and Poupon was rescued by Loïck Peyron, who finally finished second, in what was generally a successful first run of the race. Mike Plant, the lone American in the race, disqualified himself after receiving minor assistance near Campbell Island, New Zealand after a $5 rigging part on his sloop, Duracell, was damaged in the Pacific Ocean. Plant was scored Did Not Finish, but to the admiring French, he emerged a real hero after repairing the rigging and finishing the course as an unofficial competitor in 135 days, a new American single-handed circumnavigation record.

Race Director for the first edition was Denis Horeau, who went on to run further editions of the race.

Competitors

Profile Pictures

Entries Information

Results

Incidents 
 Philippe Poupon's boat was struck by a wave and ended up lying heeled at 90 degrees. Loïck Peyron, in a remarkable bit of seamanship, took the boat in tow, and after Philippe Poupon detached the mast the boat righted itself. A film of the event can be seen here.
 Jean-Yves Terlain dismasted south of Cape Town.
 Guy Bernardin was forced to retire due to a dental problem and made a stopover in Australia

References and publications

External links 
 Official Vendée Globe Website
 Official Vendée Globe YouTube Channel

1989 in sailing
1990 in sailing
Vendée Globe